Emmanuel Front (born 27 January 1973) is a French sprinter. He competed in the men's 4 × 400 metres relay at the 2000 Summer Olympics.

References

External links
 

1973 births
Living people
Athletes (track and field) at the 2000 Summer Olympics
French male sprinters
Olympic athletes of France
Place of birth missing (living people)